The 1977–78 St. Louis Blues season was the 11th for the franchise in St. Louis, Missouri.  Prior to the season, the team's founders, Sid Salomon, Jr. and Sid Salomon III, sold the team to pet food giant Ralston Purina, and the St. Louis Arena became the Checkerdome.  The Blues finished the season with a record of 20 wins, 47 losses and 13 ties for 53 points, and finished out of the playoffs for only the second time in team history.

Off-season

Regular season

Final standings

Schedule and results

Playoffs
The Blues did not make the playoffs for the first time since the 1973–74 season.

Player statistics

Regular season
Scoring

Goaltending

Awards and records

Transactions

Draft picks
St. Louis's draft picks at the 1977 NHL amateur draft held at the Mount Royal Hotel in Montreal, Quebec.

Farm teams

See also
1977–78 NHL season

References

External links

St. Louis Blues seasons
St. Louis
St. Louis
St Louis
St Louis